The Rat Swallower was among the most popular  of the primitive cartoons that were shown by magic lantern projectionists, or "savoyards" that were common in the cities of early 19th-century Europe. The Rat Swallower featured a sleeping man, whose mouth opened and closed as the projectionist made snoring sounds. The image of a rat would then move across the man's sleeping body, and jump into his mouth as he snored. 

19th-century animated short films